Amphonyx jamaicensis is a moth of the  family Sphingidae. It is known from Jamaica.

References

Amphonyx
Moths described in 2006
Moths of the Caribbean